Pascal Théophile (born 22 February 1970 in Pointe-a-Pitre, Guadeloupe) is a former French athlete who specialised in the 100 meters. Theophile competed at the 1996 Summer Olympics where he reached the quarter finals of the 100 meters and the final of the 4 × 100 metres relay. His personal best in the individual event, 10.21, was set in 1995, although he ran a wind-assisted 10.13 the following year.

References

Olympic athletes of France
French male sprinters
French people of Guadeloupean descent
Living people
Athletes (track and field) at the 1996 Summer Olympics
Athletes (track and field) at the 1991 Mediterranean Games
Athletes (track and field) at the 1997 Mediterranean Games
1970 births
Mediterranean Games bronze medalists for France
Mediterranean Games medalists in athletics